The Giardino Botanico "Nuova Gussonea" is a botanical garden located at an altitude of 1700 m on the southern side of Mount Etna, in area B of the Etna Natural Park, Ragalna, Province of Catania, Sicily, Italy. It has a surface of about 10 hectares.

The garden was established in 1979 through an agreement between the Directorate General of Forests of the Sicilian Region and the University of Catania, and inaugurated in 1981. Its name honors botanist Giovanni Gussone, and reflects a short-lived previous garden established on the site in 1903.

The garden replicates the entire volcano's plant environments, including special features such as a lava flow and small caves. Major areas are as follows:

 Cisternazze - natural vegetation
 Flower beds - about 200 beds focused mainly on vegetation of Mount Etna, and arranged into areas according to altitude
 Lava cave - plants adapted to low light, including Asplenium septentrionale
 Lava flow - with natural vegetation
 Nursery - arranged in phylogenetic order
 Stream (seasonal) - poplars
 Wooded areas - primarily birch (Betula aetnensis), as well as beech, oak, poplar, etc.

The garden also contains a seed repository (Rifugio Valerio Giacomini) and a small meteorological station for recording climate data.

See also 
 List of botanical gardens in Italy

References 
 Giardino Botanico "Nuova Gussonea"
 Horti entry (Italian)
 E. Poli Marchese, G. Maugeri, "Strutturazione e funzione  del giardino “Nuova Gussonea” dell’Etna", Atti Acc. Medit. Scienze, 1,1,1:95-98, 1982.
 Grillo M. "A study on the lichen flora and vegetation of the  Nuova Gussonea botanic garden (Mount Etna, Sicily)", Giorn. Bot. Ital., vol. 122, n. 5-6:267-273, 1989.
 E. Poli Marchese, "Il giardino botanico etneo “Nuova  Gussonea”", I giardini di montagna. Atti Convegno Prà Catin,  Torino:147:151, 1986.
 E. Poli Marchese, M. Grillo, E. Romano, "Le piante  spontanee e introdotte nel giardino botanico “Nuova Gussonea” dell’Etna", Arch. Bot. e Biogeo. Ital., n. 63, 1-2:48-69, 1988.
 E. Poli Marchese, G. Maugeri, "Il Giardino Botanico <Nuova  Gussonea>", in F.M. Raimondo, Orti botanici, Giardini Alpini, Arboreti Italiani, Editore Grifo, Palermo: 431-436, 1992.
 E. Poli Marchese, C. DiStefano, M. Grillo, E. Romano, "Danni da conigli nell’area del giardino botanico “Nuova  Gussonea” dell’Etna", Gion. Bot. Ital., 128, 1:413, 1994.
 E. Poli Marchese, "Giardino Botanico Nuova Gussonea", Serra La Nave – Etna, Istituto di Biologia ed Ecologia vegetale, Università degli Studi di Catania – Azienda Foreste Demaniali Regione Siciliana, November 1995.
 E. Poli Marchese, "Aspetti del paesaggio vegetale dell’Etna", in Etna Mito d’Europa, Maimone Editore, Catania 1997, p. 69.

Botanical gardens in Italy
Buildings and structures in the Province of Catania
Gardens in Sicily